The Armstrong Siddeley Double Mamba is a turboprop engine design developed in the late 1940s of around . It was used mostly on the Fairey Gannet anti-submarine aircraft developed for the Fleet Air Arm of the Royal Navy.

Design and development
The Double Mamba (rarely known as the Twin Mamba) was a development of the Armstrong Siddeley Mamba with two Mambas driving contra-rotating propellers through a combining gearbox.

Engine starting was by cartridge, however, forced air restart was achieved in flight. One engine could be shut down in flight to conserve fuel. Shutting down one engine also stopped one of the propellers.

Variants

ASMD.1 (2 x ASMa.3) used on Fairey Gannet A.S. Mk.1 and Blackburn B-88
ASMD.3 (2 x ASMa.5) used on Fairey Gannet A.S. Mk.4
ASMD.4 (2 x ASMa.6) used on Fairey Gannet AEW Mk.3
ASMD.8 (2 x ASMa.6) used on Fairey Gannet AEW Mk.3

Applications
 Blackburn B-88
 Fairey Gannet
The Double Mamba engine was also proposed for the Westland Westminster, a 30-seat helicopter that was later built as a prototype powered by a pair of Napier Eland E220 turboshaft engines.

Engines on display

Preserved Double Mamba engines are on public display at the:
Australian National Aviation Museum
Deutsches Museum Flugwerft Schleissheim
Gatwick Aviation Museum
South Yorkshire Aircraft Museum
Imperial War Museum Duxford
Midland Air Museum
Queensland Air Museum
East Midlands Aeropark
Museum of Berkshire Aviation

Specifications (ASMD.3)

See also

References

Notes

Bibliography

 Gunston, Bill. World Encyclopedia of Aero Engines. Cambridge, England. Patrick Stephens Limited, 1989.

External links

 Original Armstrong Siddeley Double Mamba advertisement - Flight, 29 June 1950

1940s turboprop engines
Double Mamba